William Neilson (18 August 1873 – 16 March 1960) was a Scotland international rugby union player. He was born in Thankerton House in Holytown, near Glasgow, Scotland. Holytown was historically in Bothwell parish leading to some references to state Bothwell.

Rugby Union career

Amateur career

He attended Merchiston Castle School and was captain of the rugby and cricket sides and School Prefect. He represented Scotland at rugby while still attending Merchiston.

Neilson played for West of Scotland in November 1886. He was still at school but playing for West's first team.

He then left to go to Clare College, Cambridge, where he also played rugby for the university before graduating BA in 1894.

He played for London Scottish on his move to London as a barrister.

Provincial career

Neilson played for Glasgow District against North of Scotland District on 2 January 1886. Later that year Neilson played for Glasgow in the Inter-City match against Edinburgh District.

He played for West of Scotland District against East of Scotland District on 26 January 1889.

He was being released from Merchiston Castle School to play for Glasgow District.

International career

In 1891, he made his debut, along with his brother George in the game against . One of the four Neilson brothers played in each of the twenty five matches between Willie and George's debut in 1891, until 1899, when Robert had to withdraw from the Calcutta Cup line-up after breaking his nose.

Administrative career

He was vice-president of the Scottish Rugby Union from 1904 to 1905.

Neilson became President of the Scottish Rugby Union in 1905.

Cricket career

He played for the West of Scotland Cricket Club.

He played cricket for Clare College while at Cambridge University.

Military career

He served in the 2nd Battalion of the Highland Light Infantry in World War I. He was promoted to captain and was wounded in 1918 and taken as a Prisoner of War.

Law career

He then became a Barrister and settled in London. He was called to the Bar in 1896 at the Inner Temple.

Family

His father was James Neilson, an Ironmaster and second cousin of Walter Montgomerie Neilson and his mother was Jane Thomson, daughter of George Thomson, the famous Glasgow shipbuilder.

Three of William's brothers, George Thomson Neilson, Walter Gordon Neilson and Robert Thomson Neilson also played international rugby for Scotland. George and Robert were also Presidents of the SRU. The four brothers never got to play together, although on at least five occasions, various pairings played on the same team.

References

Sources

 Bath, Richard (ed.) The Scotland Rugby Miscellany (Vision Sports Publishing Ltd, 2007 )
 Thorburn, Sandy The History of Scottish Rugby

1873 births
1960 deaths
Scottish rugby union players
Scotland international rugby union players
Willie
People educated at Merchiston Castle School
Alumni of Clare College, Cambridge
Presidents of the Scottish Rugby Union
West of Scotland District (rugby union) players
Glasgow District (rugby union) players
West of Scotland FC players
Cambridge University R.U.F.C. players
London Scottish F.C. players
Rugby union players from North Lanarkshire
Rugby union three-quarters